The East Coast Music Association is a non-profit association that hosts an annual awards ceremony based in Atlantic Canada for music appreciation on the East Coast of Canada.  Its mission is to develop, advance and celebrate East Coast Canadian music, its artists and its industry professionals throughout the region and around the world, and advocate for members to ensure they can sustain music careers while based in Canada’s Atlantic region."

The East Coast Music Awards have been a springboard for many Atlantic Canadians, including Sarah McLachlan, Ashley MacIsaac, Rawlins Cross, Lennie Gallant, Natalie MacMaster, Gordie Sampson, Joel Plaskett, The Rankin Family, Rita MacNeil, Bruce Guthro, J.P. Cormier and Great Big Sea.

Each year, the association awards one person with the Dr. Helen Creighton Lifetime Achievement Award. The award recognizes an artist or band that has had a profound and lasting effect on the Atlantic Canadian music industry, and the recipient is chosen by the ECMA board of directors. Helen Creighton (1899-1989) was an author and pioneer in the field of folklore, both nationally and internationally. In 1958, she was one of the judges at the first Miramichi Folksong Festival, organized by Louise Manny. Recipients of this prestigious award include Stompin' Tom Connors (1993), Édith Butler (1997) and Don Messer (1998).

The ECMA is a registered non-profit association. Membership is open to all individuals working in any sector of the music industry, or those who support the music industry. Membership includes musicians, artists, agents, managers, record companies, studios, media, related corporation and retailers. As of 2021, it has over 1,000 members.

History
In 1989, Halifax music industry promoter Rob Cohn launched the Maritime Music Awards. In 1991, Cohn joined forces with Sheri Jones, Karen Byers, Lee Stanley, Mike Barkhouse, Peter Hendrickson, Bruce Morel and Tony Kelly to form the East Coast Music Association. The association's event became known as the East Coast Music Awards and covered all of the provinces in Atlantic Canada. The award trophy was designed by Nova Scotia sculptor Valerie J. Stone. The event moved from The Flamingo Cafe & Lounge to the Rebecca Cohn Auditorium at the Dalhousie Arts Centre and new awards were added. With the formation of provincial music industry associations it was decided that the event would move each year, revolving from province to province. The East Coast Music Awards: Festival and Conference is now a five-day event. Since 2002, its awards gala has been aired in a two-hour national broadcast on CBC Television.

1989 Maritime Music Awards
Halifax, Nova Scotia. The first Maritime Music Awards took place at The Flamingo Cafe & Lounge, which won Best Venue of the Year. There were just seven awards; winners were 100 Flowers, Rita MacNeil, Haywire, Matt Minglewood and John Gracie. Sarah McLachlan received three nominations and performed at the event, which was broadcast on Community Access TV Cable 10.

1990 Maritime Music Awards
Halifax, Nova Scotia. This year, Cohn held the awards at the Crazy Horse Cabaret and were offered in eight categories. They were won by Rita MacNeil, Anne Murray, John Gracie, Brett Ryan and the band ICU. Performers at the ceremony included Matt Minglewood's Jam Band.

1991 East Coast Music Awards
Halifax, Nova Scotia. There were 12 categories at the inaugural East Coast Music Awards. Winners were Rita MacNeil, Stompin' Tom Connors, The Rankin Family, Brett Ryan, Figgy Duff and local bands Black Pool and The Floorboards.

1992 East Coast Music Awards
Halifax, Nova Scotia. For the second East Coast Music Awards, a trade show was added and there were 13 categories. Winners were the Barra MacNeils, Joan Kennedy, The Rankin Family, Sarah McLachlan, Natalie MacMaster, Lennie Gallant, John Campbelljohn and the band Real World.

1993 East Coast Music Awards
Halifax, Nova Scotia. The winners at this year's awards were Anita Best, Pamela Morgan, Terry Kelly, The Rankin Family, Rita MacNeil, Rawlins Cross, and Émile Benoît (posthumously). At these awards, The Stompin’ Tom Connors Award was created when Stompin’ Tom was presented with the Dr. Helen Creighton Lifetime Achievement Award. He preferred to return the award, and have an award be created to honor those who have made a significant, or long-term contribution to the East Coast Music Awards Industry.

1994 East Coast Music Awards
St. John's, Newfoundland and Labrador. The number of awards for this year increased to 16; winners were Natalie MacMaster, The Hardship Post, Roger Howse and Ruff Ideas, The Rankin Family, Ron Hynes, Sarah McLachlan, the Holly Cole Trio, The Irish Descendants and Lennie Gallant.

1995 East Coast Music Awards
Sydney, Nova Scotia. This year's winners, in 17 categories, were Lennie Gallant, Eric's Trip, Symphony Nova Scotia, The Irish Descendants, Rita MacNeil, Theresa Malenfant, Ashley MacIsaac, Rawlins Cross, Chris Mitchell, Les Méchants Maquereaux and the Barra MacNeils.

1996 East Coast Music Awards
Charlottetown, Prince Edward Island. This year's event was held at the Eastlink Centre, which allowed it to swell to 4,000 people. Winners, in 19 categories, were Lee Cremo, Annick Gagnon, Ray Legere, Laura Smith, Sloan, the Saint John String Quartet, Stompin’ Tom Connors, Great Big Sea, Goodspeed and Staples Quartet, Dave MacIsaac, The Rankin Family, Duncan Wells and the Barra MacNeils.

1997 East Coast Music Awards
Moncton, New Brunswick. This year, 7,000 awards show guests attended the televised broadcast in Moncton, with special guest Édith Butler and broadcaster Peter Gzowski. The event attracted 1,500 delegates, including 200 media from around the world, and injected $3-million into the local economy. There was a 76-hour jam session, a Cape Breton Rave Night and a concert series featuring Great Big Sea, Four the Moment, Barachois and Bruce Guthro, who signed with EMI Music Canada that week-end. The winners, in 20 categories, were Sloan, Ashley MacIsaac, Natalie MacMaster, Barachois, Teresa Doyle, Puirt a Baroque, Terry Kelly, Great Big Sea, Mary Jane Lamond, Jeri Brown, the Nova Scotia Mass Choir, Bruce Guthro children's entertainers Audrey and Alex, and the bluegrass group Exit 13.

1998 East Coast Music Awards
Halifax, Nova Scotia. The winners this year, in 26 categories, were Sarah McLachlan, Exit 13, Four the Moment, the Glamour Puss Blues Band, Great Big Sea, The Super Friendz, Lennie Gallant, Symphony Nova Scotia with Georg Tintner, the Johnny Favourite Swing Orchestra, Julian Austin, J.P. Cormier, Jamie Sparks, Richard Wood, Michelle Boudreau Samson, Sam the Record Man, graphic designer Carol Kennedy, media members Greg Guy and Mike Campbell, sound technician David Hillier, and production company Tour Tech East.

1999 East Coast Music Awards
St. John's, Newfoundland and Labrador. The winners this year, in 19 categories, were Este Mundo, Gordie Sampson, Blou, The John Campbelljohn Trio, Bruce Guthro, Sol, children's entertainers Kidd Brothers, David MacDonald, Great Big Sea, Natalie MacMaster, Shirley Eikhard, The Rankin Family, Rawlins Cross, and Denise Murray.

2000 East Coast Music Awards
Sydney, Nova Scotia. This was an economically successful event that allowed the ECMA to gain a sound financial footing.  It commemorated the influence of The Rankin Family Cape Breton's Celtic Music family, and launched Radio freECMA, a low-power radio station that, in a partnership with the government of Prince Edward Island, provided coverage over the Internet. It also launched Continuous Jam, a three-day musical extravaganza featuring sets from all genres and from all levels of Atlantic Canadian talent. At the 15th Gemini Awards, the awards show won Best Music, Variety Program or Series.

2001 East Coast Music Awards
Charlottetown, Prince Edward Island attracted more than 1,700 delegates and debuted the Jazz/Classical Concert Series. The event fostered  interest in the formation of the Prince Edward Island Music Awards and introduced Soundwaves, a program that sees musicians visiting schools throughout P.E.I., and hospitals, businesses and churches in Charlottetown. Over this weekend, the Ennis Sisters signed a two-record deal with Warner Music Canada. At the 16th Gemini Awards, the awards show won Best Music, Variety Program or Series.

2002 East Coast Music Awards
Saint John, New Brunswick. The competitive bid process in New Brunswick sparked community involvement and drew over 2200 delegates. New initiatives were an industry awards brunch, the Warner Roots Room for acoustic performances, the UniSon bilingual concert, and the bluegrass stage that attracted an estimated 5,000 fans. In addition to the national CBC Television broadcast of the awards show, the MuchMusic ECMA Rock stage got a prime-time special on Much, and CBC Radio's Definitely Not the Opera broadcast live from the main stage. The Dr. Helen Creighton Lifetime Achievement Award was presented to famed fiddler Ned Landry.

2003 East Coast Music Awards
Halifax, Nova Scotia. The conference celebrated its 15-year anniversary with the City of Stages, or 14  live stages. Approximately 2000 delegates attended. The Soundwaves Program brought music to 30,000 students throughout the region, and corporate sponsorship and support for ECMA reached new heights. An Urban Music Series featuring hip-hop, R&B and the Black Vibes Showcase were initiated. ECMA 2003 brought international bookings to several East Coast artists as European music industry professionals were in attendance. At the 18th Gemini Awards, the awards show was nominated for Best Music, Variety Program or Series.

2004 East Coast Music Awards
St. John's, Newfoundland and Labrador. A strategic partnership was developed with the Atlantic Film Festival, and film and TV elements were introduced to the conference. A number of East Coast recording artists negotiated contracts for national licensing and distribution deals. The ECMA Songwriters Circle was broadcast live across the country on CBC Radio and across Atlantic Canada on CBC Television. The Government of Newfoundland & Labrador noted that the awards represented a regional economic impact of $6 million.

2005 East Coast Music Awards
Sydney, Nova Scotia. This was the first major event held at the new Membertou Trade and Convention Centre and the Sydney Marine Terminal.  The conference included a new international program (50+ delegates) and successful partnering with Cape Breton University. The lifetime achievement award was presented to legendary fiddler Buddy MacMaster. The ECMA began moving towards a master class format, presenting classes in songwriting, export readiness and musical scoring for gaming and television.  The success of the Soundwaves was parlayed into a new program, Sound-off, a band competition among schools across Cape Breton.

2006 East Coast Music Awards
Charlottetown, Prince Edward Island. For the first time, organizers held the gala dinner and industry awards ceremony on Saturday night. The Songwriters' Circle and the Rogers Television Yamaha 72-Hour Jam  were featured events; the CBC moved the televised broadcast from Sunday night to Monday night. At the 2006 Gemini Awards, the event's hosts--Trailer Park Boys Mike Smith, Robb Wells and John Paul Tremblay, were nominated for Best Performance or Host in a Variety Program or Series.

2007 East Coast Music Awards
Halifax, Nova Scotia. For the first time, the event was introduced as the East Coast Music Awards, Festival and Conference. The four-day conference had 50+ international music industry delegates. The show marked the recent passing of East Coast legends John Allan Cameron, Dutch Mason and Denny Doherty. The three Trailer Park Boys returned as hosts. ECMAfest brought the downtown Halifax to life with many official and partnered stages.

2008 East Coast Music Awards
Fredericton, New Brunswick. The focus this year was on Aboriginal musical talent, via the Aboriginal Partnered Showcase. The music awards gala was held at the Aitken Centre, and Steven Page from the Barenaked Ladies hosted the entire event (coining the term "Barenaked East Coast Music"). This year's event was not televised; instead, a TV special was broadcast with scenes of venues, awards presentations and hotel antics. The year's big winner was Joel Plaskett Emergency who won seven awards, most centering on his acclaimed concept release Ashtray Rock. The Dr. Helen Creighton Lifetime Achievement Award was presented to the Acadian group 1755. 

New this year was the Stompin' Tom Award, dedicated to the unsung heroes of Atlantic music. Stompin' Tom Connors created the concept for this award in 1993 to pay homage to musicians that have made long-term contributions to the East coast music industry, and artists from each Maritime province were honoured--Ivan and Vivian Hicks (New Brunswick), The Ducats (Newfoundland and Labrador), The Tremtones (Prince Edward Island), Oakley (Mainland Nova Scotia), and Aldun MacVicar (Cape Breton).
	
A 2009 study found that, in 2007 and 2008, the ECMA generated a local economic impact of $8 million, not including sales by artists and companies.

2009 East Coast Music Awards
Corner Brook, Newfoundland and Labrador. The hosts for the event were Damhnait Doyle and Jian Ghomeshi of CBC Radio One's Q. The show began with a skit featuring Premier Danny Williams and included the posthumous awarding of the Dr. Helen Creighton Lifetime Achievement Award to the Corner Brook country and western pioneer Dick Nolan. Multiple award-winners were Hey Rosetta!, Jill Barber, Gordie Sampson and Matt Andersen. The show featured the reunion of Rawlins Cross, and introduced the ECMA Fan's Choice Award, presented to Nova Scotia rapper Classified.

2010 East Coast Music Awards
Sydney, Nova Scotia. This year, the awards were the Bell Aliant 2010 East Coast Music Awards presented by RBC at Centre 200. Multiple award-winners were Catherine MacLellan, In-Flight Safety, The Motorleague and Joel Plaskett, who won six awards, including Sennheiser Entertainer of the Year. The Rankin Family was honoured with the Director’s Special Achievement Award for their extraordinary contribution to East Coast music, and the Dr. Helen Creighton Lifetime Achievement Award was posthumously awarded to Scott Turner, whose son Trevor Turnball played four of his songs.

2011 East Coast Music Awards
Charlottetown, Prince Edward Island. The East Coast Music Association changed format this year. The number of awards was down to 28, and they were presented on different days, and at different venues and concerts around the city, culminating with the Bell Aliant 2011 East Coast Music Awards Gala presented by RBC. This was the first year of A Sound Celebration, which brings together pop stars and musicians from orchestras. This year, it was PEI artists Jenn Grant, Meaghan Blanchard, Paper Lions, Richard Wood, Vishtèn and Symphony Nova Scotia.

2012 East Coast Music Awards
Moncton, New Brunswick. This year saw the launch of the ECMA Breakout Stage, a new program for emerging artists that uses workshops and performances to foster new artists. ECMA partnered with the Province of New Brunswick and the local Capitol Theatre to host a First Nation’s showcase. A Sound Celebration brought together musicians from Atlantic Simphonia, Symphony New Brunswick and the New Brunswick Youth Orchestra, Chris Colepaugh, David Myles, Samantha Robichaud and Matt Andersen. Multiple winners were Anderson, Myles, Hey Rosetta!, Keith Mullins and Scott MacMillan. Jimmy Rankin led with eight nominations but won the Fans’ Choice Video of the Year award. Roch Voisine was presented with the Director's Special Achievement Award; Voisine was also the host of the gala, which was streamed live from Casino New Brunswick. Catherine McKinnon was presented with The Dr. Helen Creighton Lifetime Achievement Award.

2013 East Coast Music Awards

Halifax, Nova Scotia. Over 1,100 musicians applied to perform on the event's 10 stages. There were 39 categories this year; winners were Lone Cloud, Cam Smith, Matt Mays, Charlie A`Court, Donna & Andy, Derek Charke, Helen Pridmore and Wesley Ferreira, RyLee Madison, English Words, The Stanfields, George Canyon, Rose Cousins (who co-hosted the event with David Myles), Vishtèn, Stephanie Mainville, Joel Miller, Jenn Grant, Radio Radio, Joel Plaskett, Ben Caplan, Tim Chaisson, The Once, Dave Gunning, Natalie MacMaster, Gypsophilia, The Halifax Pop Explosion, Lakewind Sound Studios, Sound Engineers Jamie Foulds and David Hillier, Manager Louis Thomas, producer Daniel Ledwell, Fred’s Records, Radio host Jimmie Inch, graphic designer Jud Haynes, CBC Mainstreet Nova Scotia and The Carleton Music Bar & Grill.

The event also featured a video tribute to country music legend Stompin' Tom Connors, who died a few days before the event.

2014 East Coast Music Awards 
Charlottetown, Prince Edward Island. The Awards Gala was hosted by Seamus O'Regan. Old Man Luedecke and Dave Gunning were multiple winners. Rita MacNeil, who died in 2013, was honoured with the Directors' Special Achievement Award. The Dr. Helen Creighton Lifetime Achievement Award went to The Chaisson Trio, the Industry Builder Award to Grady Poe, and the Musician's Achievement Award to Jay Smith, who also died in 2013. The Stompin' Tom Award was awarded to Flo Sampson, Alan Dowling, Kellie Walsh, Susan Hunter and Bob Mersereau.

2015 East Coast Music Awards 
St. John's, Newfoundland and Labrador. As an experiment, this year's awards gala, hosted by Jonny Harris, was held on the Thursday night, rather than the Sunday. Multiple award-winners were The Town Heroes, Chelsea Amber, and Hey Rosetta!.

2016 East Coast Music Awards 
Sydney, Nova Scotia. The Awards Gala was hosted by Ashley MacIsaac and Heather Rankin. Hey Rosetta!, Natalie MacMaster & Donnell Leahy, and Amelia Curran were multiple award-winners.

2017 East Coast Music Awards 
Saint John, New Brunswick. This year, the East Coast Music Association received the National Arts Centre Award for Distinguished Contribution to Touring in the Performing Arts, for its long-standing commitment to promoting touring by musicians from Atlantic Canada, both at home and abroad. The awards show was hosted by the British comedian James Mullinger, who now lives in Atlantic Canada. Multiple award-winners were Classified, Ria Mae and Lennie Gallant.

2018 East Coast Music Awards 
Halifax, Nova Scotia. This event marked the 30th Anniversary of the ECMAs. Multiple awards went to folk singer Rose Cousins. The Directors' Special Achievement Award was posthumously awarded to 
Kevin MacMichael; the Dr. Helen Creighton Lifetime Achievement Award was given to music promoter Lynn Horne. Allister MacGillivray's "Song For The Mira" was inducted into the Canadian Songwriters Hall of Fame.

2019 East Coast Music Awards 
Charlottetown, Prince Edward Island. Multiple awards went to Classified and Jeremy Dutcher. Peter Chaisson won the Musician's Achievement Award and Music PEI Executive Director Rob Oakie won the Stompin' Tom Award. Lennie Gallant, whose song Peter's Dream was inducted into the Canadian Songwriters Hall of Fame, received the Directors' Special Achievement Award.

2020 East Coast Music Awards 
St. John's, Newfoundland and Labrador. Because of the COVID-19 pandemic, the event included socially-distanced festivities and concerts, and a pre-recorded awards broadcast. During the broadcast, Ron Hynes was posthumously inducted into the Canadian Songwriters Hall of Fame.

2021 East Coast Music Awards 
Sydney, Nova Scotia (Virtual). Plans to hold an in-person conference and awards broadcast were once again thwarted by the COVID-19 pandemic, and a virtual conference was held on June 9-13, 2021. The awards ceremonies were broadcast on YouTube, during which Rita MacNeil was posthumously inducted into the Canadian Songwriters Hall of Fame. The Dr. Helen Creighton Lifetime Achievement Award was received by Joella Foulds, while the Fans' Choice Entertainer of the Year went to Beòlach.

2022 East Coast Music Awards 
Fredericton, New Brunswick. The annual conference and awards ceremony was held in person and broadcast online, with Hillsburn winning a total of three awards. The band 1755 were inducted into the Canadian Songwriters Hall of Fame, a Director's Special Achievement award went to Patsy Gallant, and the Dr. Helen Creighton Lifetime Achievement Award was received by Cutting Crew.

2023 East Coast Music Awards 
Halifax, Nova Scotia. The 35th anniversary edition of the East Coast Music Awards and Conference will take place in person in Halifax, Nova Scotia, from May 3-7, 2023. Nominees were announced on January 24, 2023, with Nova Scotia's Classified and Prince Edward Island's The East Pointers each receiving a leading six nominations.

See also

Music of Canada

References

External links
 

Canadian music awards
Awards established in 1989
1989 establishments in Nova Scotia